Modanlı is a village in the Ağın District of Elazığ Province in Turkey. Its population is 50 (2021).

References

Villages in Ağın District